Bob McAllister (July 7, 1899 – October 22, 1962) was an American sprinter. He competed in the men's 100 metres at the 1928 Summer Olympics. McAllister was known as The Flying Cop, after his profession as a New York City police officer.

References

1899 births
1962 deaths
Athletes (track and field) at the 1928 Summer Olympics
American male sprinters
Olympic track and field athletes of the United States
Track and field athletes from New York City
New York City Police Department officers
USA Outdoor Track and Field Championships winners